Piła  is a village in the administrative district of Gmina Gostycyn, within Tuchola County, Kuyavian-Pomeranian Voivodeship, in north-central Poland.

Climate
Piła has a oceanic climate (Köppen Cfb).

References

Villages in Tuchola County